Indian Lake is a lake in Blue Earth County, Minnesota, in the United States. Indian Lake was named for the Native Americans who settled there.

See also
List of lakes in Minnesota

References

Lakes of Minnesota
Lakes of Blue Earth County, Minnesota